Daniel da Silva dos Anjos (born 21 January 1996) is a Brazilian professional footballer who last played as a forward for Portuguese side Tondela in Liga Portugal 2.

On November 30, 2020, Daniel dos Anjos tested positive for COVID-19, and in subsequent medical tests post-recovery he was diagnosed with acute myocarditis, which led him to temporarily suspend his career.

Club career
Born in Boa Esperança, Anjos arrived at the youth academy of Figueirense in 2012. On 12 April 2015, he made his first team debut in a 3–1 defeat against Joinville in the final of the Campeonato Catarinense. After being promoted to the first team in early 2016, he joined Flamengo on 30 March and was assigned to the under-20 team. On 25 January 2017, he was loaned to the first team of Atlético Goianiense for the season's Campeonato Goiano campaign.

After being released by the Mengão in July 2017, Anjos joined Portuguese club S.L. Benfica and was assigned to its reserve team on 22 July after agreeing to a five-year deal.

References

External links

1996 births
Living people
Association football forwards
Brazilian footballers
Figueirense FC players
CR Flamengo footballers
Atlético Clube Goianiense players
S.L. Benfica B players
Liga Portugal 2 players
Brazilian expatriate footballers
Brazilian expatriate sportspeople in Portugal